Kechah Bash (also Romanized as Kechah Bāsh) is a village in Bash Qaleh Rural District, in the Central District of Urmia County, West Azerbaijan Province, Iran. At the 2006 census, its population was 401, in 119 families.

References 

Populated places in Urmia County